James Bell Hildebrand ( – November 18, 1952) was an American college football player and coach and civil engineer. He served as the head football coach Mississippi Agricultural & Mechanical College—now known as Mississippi State University—for the 1896 season. Hildebrand was hired as the first full-time head coach at the school after the student body raised $300 ($ in  dollars) to hire him. During his one-season tenure, Hildebrand compiled a record of 0–4.

Hildebrand was born in the Whitehaven neighborhood of Memphis, Tennessee. He attended Whitehaven High School in Memphis and The Webb School in Bell Buckle, Tennessee. Hildebrand graduated from Vanderbilt University with a degree in civil engineering. He and Heiskell Weatherford had a civil engineering practice in Memphis. Hildebrand later worked in the oil industry in Little Rock, Arkansas. He died on November 18, 1952, at Cage Nursing Home in Memphis, following a long illness.

Head coaching record

References

Year of birth missing
1870s births
1952 deaths
19th-century players of American football
20th-century American engineers
American businesspeople in the oil industry
American civil engineers
American football guards
Mississippi State Bulldogs football coaches
Vanderbilt Commodores football players
Players of American football from Memphis, Tennessee
Coaches of American football from Tennessee
Engineers from Tennessee